is a Japanese voice actor and narrator who is affiliated with Aoni Production. He has been active in the voice talent business since 1988.

Voice Roles

Television Anime
One Piece - Paulie, Dosun and Lacroix

Anime OVA
Legend of the Heroes ~ Trails in the Sky - Walter

Games
Castlevania: Curse of Darkness - Hector
Dynasty Warriors 3 - Zhou Yu, Xu Zhu
Dynasty Warriors 3 XL - Zhou Yu
Dynasty Warriors 4 - Zhou Yu, Xu Zhu
Dynasty Warriors 4 XL - Zhou Yu
Dynasty Warriors 5 - Zhou Yu
Dynasty Warriors 5 Empires - Zhou Yu
Dynasty Warriors 6 - Zhou Yu
Dynasty Warriors 7 - Zhou Yu
Dynasty Warriors 7 Empires - Zhou Yu
Dynasty Warriors 8 - Zhou Yu, Xu Zhu
One Piece: Pirates' Carnival - Paulie
Fist of the North Star: Ken's Rage 2 - Shew
The Legend of Heroes: Kuro no Kiseki II – Crimson Sin - Walter Kron
Tales of Symphonia - Forcystus
Sword of the Berserk: Guts' Rage - Dante

Tokusatsu
Juukou B-Fighter - Extradimensional Supplier Kabuto (eps. 35 - 36, 52 - 53)
Gamera 2: Attack of Legion
B-Fighter Kabuto - Extradimensional Supplier Kabuto (ep. 50)
Gamera 3: The Revenge of Iris
Mirai Sentai Timeranger - Arms Smuggler Hammer (ep. 29)
Tokusou Sentai Dekaranger - Ring announcer (ep. 26)
Engine Sentai Go-onger vs. Gekiranger - Savage Land Water Sky Special Barbaric Machine Beast Nunchaku Banki
Zyuden Sentai Kyoryuger: It's Here! Armed On Midsummer Festival!! - Debo Tangosekku, Debo Tanabanta

References

External links
 Takahiro Yoshimizu at Aoni Production 
 
 

1968 births
Living people
Male voice actors from Osaka Prefecture
Japanese male voice actors
Aoni Production voice actors